Belonophora coriacea is a species of flowering plant in the family Rubiaceae. It is found in Nigeria, Central African Republic, Cameroon, Equatorial Guinea, Congo-Brazzaville, and Congo-Kinshasa (Zaire or Democratic Republic of the Congo).

References

External links
World Checklist of Rubiaceae

coriacea
Flora of West-Central Tropical Africa
Flora of Nigeria
Plants described in 1935